Admiral Campbell may refer to:

Alexander Campbell (Royal Navy officer) (1874–1957), British Royal Navy vice admiral
Donald Campbell (Royal Navy officer) (1788–1856), British Royal Navy rear admiral
Edward Hale Campbell (1872–1946), U.S. Navy vice admiral
George Campbell (Royal Navy officer) (1759–1821), British Royal Navy admiral
Gordon Campbell (Royal Navy officer) (1898–1980), British Royal Navy vice admiral
Ian Campbell (Royal Navy officer) (1898–1980), British Royal Navy vice admiral
John Campbell (Royal Navy officer) (1720–1790), British Royal Navy vice admiral
Patrick Campbell (Royal Navy officer) (1773–1841), British Royal Navy vice admiral

See also
Keith McNeil Campbell-Walter (1904–1976), British Royal Navy rear admiral